Natalia Alexandrovna  Iretskaya  (1843 – 15 November 1922) was a Russian singer and teacher of singing. Vocally, she is best described as a soprano.

Biography

She was born in 1843 and graduated from the Saint Petersburg Conservatory, where she studied with Henriette Nissen-Saloman (a pupil of Manuel Patricio Rodríguez García). 

She also studied in Paris with Pauline Viardot (a daughter and pupil of Manuel García). In 1874, she taught  singing in the Saint Petersburg Conservatory, and became a professor in 1881.

Pupils
Among her pupils were:
 Nadezhda Zabela-Vrubel, 
 Lydia Lipkowska, 
 Oda Slobodskaya,
 Elena Katulskaya, 
 Lubov Andreyeva-Delmas, 
 Ksenia Dorliak (mother of Nina Dorliak), 
 Aikanush Danielyan, 
 Elizaveta Petrenko, and others.

External links
 Teatralnaya Entsiklopedia: Natalia Alexandrovna Iretskaya 

1845 births
1922 deaths
Russian sopranos
Voice teachers
19th-century women opera singers from the Russian Empire
19th-century educators from the Russian Empire
20th-century Russian educators
20th-century Russian women opera singers
Women music educators
Burials at Nikolskoe Cemetery
19th-century women educators
20th-century women educators